Kismet: How Turkish Soap Operas Changed the World is a 2014 documentary film written and directed by Nina Maria Pashalidou about Turkish television drama series, commonly referred to as Turkish soap operas. It is Pashalidou's second feature documentary.

Synopsis 
The film examines the effects that the soap operas have had on the lives of their female viewers from various regions, including the Balkans, the Middle East, and North Africa. The film uses interviews of women who view the soap operas, as well as those who act, produce, and write the television shows. The first Turkish soap opera that was aired internationally was Gümüş (also known as Noor in Arab nations) and was met with high viewership mostly due its popularity with women. Paschalidou depicts the television shows as acting not only as female fantasy represented on screen, but also as a vehicle for societal change.

Festivals and nominations
International Documentary Film Festival Amsterdam (IDFA), Nominated for Best Mid-Length Doc 
One World Human Rights International Film Festival, Czech Republic
Movies that Matter, Amsterdam
Thessaloniki International Film Festival
SEOUL International Women’s Film Festival
Margaret Mead Film Festival

Reviews
“By opening discussion about women’s rights issues and portraying another way of living in traditionally conservative societies, Greek journalist and documentatarian Paschalidou reveals that Turkish soap operas also wield a soft power and influence that is opposed by many.” (Review by Reviewed by Linda Frederiksen, Washington State University)

References

Further reading

External links
 

2014 films
Documentary films about soap operas
Television in Turkey
2014 documentary films
2010s Turkish-language films
Turkish television soap operas